formerly Bandai Namco Arts, is a Japanese company formed by the merger of Bandai Visual and its subsidiary Lantis by its owner Bandai Namco Holdings in February 2018. The company is responsible for the same area of its predecessors, which those being anime production and distribution and music production and distribution.

History

In February 2018, Bandai Namco Holdings announced that Lantis and its parent company Bandai Visual would merge to turn into a company called Bandai Namco Arts on April 1, 2018, doing the same business as the past two companies but being more related to each other as one entire company.

In October 2021, Bandai Namco Holdings announced the reorganization of the group. Sunrise will handle the newly combined visual business company, which will consist of Sunrise, Bandai Namco Arts' video contents, and Bandai Namco Rights Marketing. Bandai Namco Arts will focus on the music and live events company, which will consist of Bandai Namco Arts' music contents, Bandai Namco Live Creative, and Sunrise Music.

Labels

Video Label (now part of Bandai Namco Filmworks) 
 Bandai Visual - Movies for children, live-action films and dramas
 Emotion - Anime and Tokusatsu

Music Label 
 Lantis - Main label
 Kiramune - Male voice actor label
 GloryHeaven - Label related to Sony Music Solutions
 Sunrise Music Label - Label related to Sunrise and The Orchard
 Purple One Star - Label established in collaboration with bluesofa

Notes

References

External links 

  
 

 
Mass media companies established in 2018
Anime companies
Mass media companies based in Tokyo
Entertainment companies of Japan
Film distributors of Japan
Bandai Namco Holdings subsidiaries